Gary Miller may refer to:

Gary Miller (politician) (born 1948), American politician
Michael Dunn (actor) (Gary Neil Miller, 1934–1973), American actor
Gary L. Miller (1947–1969), American soldier and Medal of Honor recipient
Gary Miller (conductor) (born 1946), American conductor and gay activist
Gary Miller (sportscaster) (born 1956), former ESPN news anchor
Gary Miller (footballer) (born 1987), Scottish footballer with Carlisle United
Gary Miller (computer scientist), American computer scientist
Gary Miller (singer) (1924–1968), British pop singer
Dr. Know (guitarist) (Gary Miller, born 1958), guitarist of the punk band Bad Brains
Gary Miller (Prison Break character), character in U.S. TV series Prison Break
Gary Miller (music producer) (born 1960), British music producer